Aveh may refer to:
 Avaj, a city in Iran
 Aveh, Fars, a village in Iran
 Aveh, Markazi, a village in Iran
 Aveh, Qazvin, a village in Iran
 a fictional place in Xenogears, see: Xenogears#Setting